Teracotona approximans is a moth in the  family Erebidae. It was described by Rothschild in 1917. It is found in Kenya, Malawi, Tanzania and Uganda.

References

Natural History Museum Lepidoptera generic names catalog

Moths described in 1917
Spilosomina